An election for the leadership of the Gibraltar Social Democrats was held after the previous leader, Daniel Feetham, resigned.

Potential candidates

Members of Parliament
After two MPs resigned the party whip to become independents, the party has five members of parliament.  Excluding Daniel Feetham, they are as follows:

 Elliott Phillips
 Edwin Reyes
 Roy Clinton - interim leader
 Trevor Hammond

The Candidates
The candidates who decided to contest were the party's interim leader, Roy Clinton and Keith Azopardi, former minister and Deputy Chief Minister of Gibraltar, who had rejoined the party in 2017 after leaving them in 2003 and politics completely since 2012

Non MPs
Two former ministers, Keith Azopardi and Damon Bossino, are said to be considering applying for the post.  A third, Peter Montegriffo, has declined to stand. Damon Bossino also announced to decline to take stand later on. Keith Azzopardi announced to stand for leadership and is now challenging Interim leader, MP and candidate, Roy Clinton.

References

2017 in Gibraltar